The Forty Rules of Love is a novel written by the Turkish author Elif Shafak, Her interest in writing this book was influenced by the degree she received in Gender and Women’s Studies. The book was published in March 2009. It is about Maulana Jalal-Ud-Din, known as Rumi and his companion Shams Tabrizi. This book explains how Shams transformed a scholar into a Sufi (mystic) through love. More than 750,000 copies of this book were sold in Turkey and France.

Synopsis 
"A novel within a novel, The Forty Rules of Love tells two parallel stories that mirror each other across two very different cultures and seven intervening centuries." It starts when a housewife, Ella, gets a book called Sweet Blasphemy for an appraisal. This book is about a thirteenth century poet, Rumi, and his spiritual teacher, Shams. The book presents Shams's Forty Love Rules at different intervals. Sweet Blasphemy was structured in a way to focus on the five elements of nature: Water, Air, Earth, Fire and Void. The chapters in each section revealed a story in line with the nature of each element. The story presented in the novel is based on "love and spirituality that explains what it means to follow your heart".

The letter "b"
Every chapter of the book starts with letter "b". It is because the secret of Quran lies in Surah Al-Fatiha and its spirit is contained in the phrase Bismillah ir Rehman ir Rahim (In the name of Allah, the most Beneficent and the most Merciful). The first Arabic letter of the Bismillah has a dot below it that symbolizes the Universe as per Sufism thoughts.

Reception

The Forty Rules of Love won Prix ALEF* - Mention Spéciale Littérature Etrangère. It was also nominated for the 2012 International IMPAC Dublin Literary Award. On November 5, 2019, the BBC News listed The Forty Rules of Love on its list of the 100 most influential novels. It was included in the "Love, Sex & Romance - February" category of Novels That Shaped Our World.

References

2009 novels
Turkish novels
Novels by Elif Şafak
Fiction set in 2008
Novels set in the 13th century